Tumo Turbo (February 23, 1970 in Sidama province – October 29, 2008) was an Ethiopian long-distance runner, who won the inaugural Prague Marathon in 1995 in 2:12:44 and the Eindhoven Marathon in 1996, clocking a time of 2:11:26. Only 3 weeks later, he came in second place in the 1996 New York Marathon in 2:10:09, finishing 15 seconds behind champion Giacomo Leone.

Turbo represented his native country in the men's marathon at the 1996 Summer Olympics, alongside Abebe Mekonnen and Belayneh Dinsamo, but did not finish the race. He held the course record of 2:14:56 in the 1992 Tel Aviv Marathon until 2014.

He died on October 29, 2008, in a fatal car accident which occurred on the Addis Ababa-Awassa road and killed another 18 people.

Achievements

References

External links

Death
Turbo Tumo Died... Interesting Marathon Runner from the mid 1990s

1970 births
2008 deaths
Ethiopian male marathon runners
Ethiopian male long-distance runners
Olympic athletes of Ethiopia
Athletes (track and field) at the 1996 Summer Olympics
Place of birth missing
World Athletics Championships athletes for Ethiopia
Road incident deaths in Ethiopia
Olympic male marathon runners
20th-century Ethiopian people